The Lincoln Hotel is an historic structure located at 536 5th Avenue in San Diego's Gaslamp Quarter, in the U.S. state of California. It was built in 1913.

See also
 List of Gaslamp Quarter historic buildings

External links

 

1913 establishments in California
Buildings and structures in San Diego
Commercial buildings completed in 1913
Gaslamp Quarter, San Diego
Hotels in San Diego